Glissading is the act of descending a steep snow- or scree-covered slope via a controlled slide on one's feet or buttocks. It is an alternative to other descent methods such as plunge stepping, and may be used to expedite a descent, or simply for the thrill. Glissading involves higher risks of injuries than other forms of descending. Glissading with crampons is especially dangerous and should never be attempted.

Methods 

There are three primary methods of glissading:
 Sitting
 Standing
 Crouching

Sitting glissade 

This is the easiest type of glissade and generally provides the greatest amount of stability. It is also less tiring than a standing or crouching glissade in softer snow. To perform a sitting glissade one sits down and slides on the slope usually holding on to an ice axe in a self-arrest position, especially when the run-out of the slope is in question.

The major drawbacks to the sitting glissade are that one's outer layers get wet, and that there is less control than in a standing glissade.

Standing glissade 

The standing glissade is often the preferred method if the person glissading is skilled in doing so and snow conditions allow. In this glissading position one has a better view of route hazards, and increased maneuverability over a sitting glissade.  In addition a standing glissade cuts down the wet and abrasive forces of the sitting glissade. The standing glissade is best performed over firm snow with a soft top layer.

Crouching glissade 

The crouching glissade is similar to the standing method except the climber sits back and drags the spike of their ice axe (held in self-arrest grip) in the snow. The method is slower but more controlled than the standing glissade.  A disadvantage to this technique is the tiring of the legs.

See also
 Mountaineering: The Freedom of the Hills

References

Climbing techniques